Below is a list of nominations and appointments to the Department of Interior by Joe Biden, the 46th president of the United States. , according to tracking by The Washington Post and Partnership for Public Service, 12 nominees have been confirmed, 1 nominee is being considered by the Senate, 2 positions do not have nominees, and 2 appointments have been made to positions that don't require Senate confirmation.

Color key 
 Denotes appointees awaiting Senate confirmation.

 Denotes appointees serving in an acting capacity.

 Denotes appointees who have left office or offices which have been disbanded.

Leadership & Office of the Secretary

Assistant Secretary for Fish and Wildlife and Parks

Offices of Indian Affairs & Insular Affairs

Office of Land and Minerals Management

Office of Water and Science

Withdrawn nominations

See also 
 Cabinet of Joe Biden, for the vetting process undergone by top-level roles including advice and consent by the Senate
 List of executive branch 'czars' e.g. Special Advisor to the President

References 

 Biden
Interior